BYD Co. Ltd. ("Build Your Dreams" Chinese: 比亚迪股份有限公司) is a publicly listed Chinese conglomerate manufacturing company headquartered in Shenzhen, Guangdong, China. It was founded by Wang Chuanfu in February 1995. The company has two major subsidiaries, BYD Auto and BYD Electronic. BYD Company manufactures automobiles, buses, electric bicycles, trucks, forklifts, solar panels and rechargeable batteries.

It has grown to become a major manufacturer of automobiles (most notably full-electric and hybrid cars, buses, trucks, etc.), battery-powered bicycles, forklift, solar panels and rechargeable batteries (mobile phone batteries, electric vehicle batteries and renewable bulk storage). The name BYD is an abbreviation of "Build Your Dreams".

History
Founded in February 1995 and listed on the Hong Kong Stock Exchange on 31 July 2002, BYD Co Ltd began as a rechargeable-battery factory competing in the Chinese market against Japanese imports.

In 2022, it was claimed in a news report that BYD surpassed Tesla for the world's most electric vehicle sales. This claim is based on BYD sales figures that include over 300,000 plug-in hybrid vehicles sold in the first six months of 2022. Plug-in hybrids with internal combustion engines are not fully electric vehicles.

Early growth
BYD grew quickly within ten years capturing more than half the world's mobile-phone battery market and becoming the largest Chinese manufacturer (and in the top four worldwide) of all types of rechargeable batteries. BYD topped the 2010 Bloomberg Businessweek Tech 100 list, a list of large, fast-growing tech companies. Replacing work done by machines with cheap, local labor lowered costs, and the company began expanding beyond batteries adding automobiles and mobile phone components.

Automobiles

A year after the 2002 acquisition of Tsinchuan Automobile Co Ltd, BYD Automobile Co Ltd was born. One of many Chinese automakers, in 2010 it was the sixth largest in terms of sales volume. On April 3, 2022, BYD announced its intention to end production of combustion engine vehicles and focus only on electric vehicles.

Rail transit

Skyrail monorail 
In 2016, BYD unveiled a working monorail prototype marketed as "Skyrail" and announced they will enter the global rail transit market. Since then BYD has begun construction of a number of systems around the world including the Guang'an Metro and the Guilin Metro in China, Line 17 in São Paulo and the SkyRail Bahia, both in Brazil. BYD is also part of a consortium that was awarded a pre-development contract to build a monorail from the San Fernando Valley to LAX via the Sepulveda Pass in Los Angeles.

Rubber-tyred tram 
BYD also have a rubber-tyred tram product, known as "SkyShuttle". Bishan rubber-tyred tram in Chongqing is operational.

Mobile phone components

Mobile phone components were added to the BYD product line in the early 2000s. But this business, BYD Electronic, was spun off in 2007.

Subsidiaries

The company has a number of subsidiaries, including BYD Auto. The following is an incomplete list.

 BYD (HK) Co Ltd 
 Trading in NiCd, NiMH and Li-ion batteries and related products, it is a wholly owned subsidiary of BYD Co Ltd that in turn wholly owns Golden Link Worldwide Limited. Golden Link Worldwide Ltd is an investment holding company incorporated in the British Virgin Islands. A wholly owned subsidiary of BYD (H.K.) Co Ltd, itself a wholly owned subsidiary of BYD Co Ltd, as of 2007 Golden Link held nearly 70% issued share capital of BYD Electronic (International) Co Ltd.
 Shenzhen BYD Electronic Parts
 Production and sale of NiMH and NiCD batteries, hardware products, instruments and flexible printed circuit boards are performed by this subsidiary Shenzhen BYD Electronic Parts Co Ltd.
 Shenzhen BYD Microelectronics
 Established in 2002, it is responsible for the design, production and sale of ICs for use in the mobile phone industry. It is registered as a sino-foreign joint venture.
 Shenzhen BYD Daimler New Technology Company A joint venture with German Daimler AG, Denza focuses on producing electric vehicles that eschew the BYD brand name.
 BYD Electronics
 An investment holding company incorporated in the Cayman Islands.
 BYD Electronic Hungary Kft
 Originally Mirae Hungary Industrial Manufacturer Ltd, and responsible for the manufacture and sale of mobile handset components, BYD Electronic Hungary Kft was purchased from Mirae Industry Co Ltd on 12 February 2008. Prior to the purchase, it manufactured handset housings for Nokia.
 Foshan Jinhui Hi-tech Optoelectronic Material
 A joint venture with Foshan Plastic Group Co Ltd and BYD (H.K) Co Ltd, it manufactures material ion exchange membranes.
 BYD Toyota EV Technology, 
 In April 2020, BYD and Toyota completed registration of the new company BYD Toyota EV Technology CO., LTD. (BTET) to jointly Research and Develop battery electric vehicles (BEVs) for the Chinese market.

Corporate affairs
The company has its corporate headquarters in the Pingshan District, Shenzhen, Guangdong province of China. Its North American headquarters are in Downtown Los Angeles, and BYD has sales offices in various countries.

The revenue of company is  64.9 billion (US$10 billion). In 2010, BYD sold a total of 519,800 vehicles, representing 2.9% of the market in China and the sixth largest manufacturer. In 2011, the BYD sales rank was outside the top ten. In 2012, the company became the 9th largest car manufacturer in China, producing over 600,000 vehicles. The majority of vehicles are sold within China; however export markets include Bahrain, the Dominican Republic, Ukraine and Moldova. The North American headquarters opened in Los Angeles in 2011. As of 2013 BYD Auto sells the e6 and Electric Bus in the United States as fleet vehicles only. BYD has supplied the Los Angeles Metro system with buses since 2015. A 2018 investigation by the Los Angeles Times found reliability issues with the BYD buses.

Production bases and facilities 

BYD has many production bases, including three locations in Shenzhen (one of which is on the self-titled 'BYD Road' in Pingshan District, Shenzhen), as well as sites in Huizhou, Shanxi, and Shanghai.

Auto production bases include an automobile assembly line in Xi'an, a K9 electric bus manufacturing plant in Dalian, a photovoltaic module (solar panel) Bloomberg New Energy Finance Tier 1 manufacturing plant in Beijing, an R&D center and nascent automobile assembly line in Shenzhen, and an R&D center in Shanghai.

US operations can be found in Elk Grove Village, Illinois, and San Francisco, California. BYD also acquired a site for a future North American headquarters in downtown Los Angeles, and has built and operates a manufacturing plant in Lancaster, California, near Los Angeles.

In 2019 a bus plant opened in Newmarket, Ontario to handle orders in Canada. BYD has three factories in Brazil, the first of which opened in 2015 for the production of electric buses. In April 2017, it inaugurated its second plant for photovoltaic modules. In 2020, BYD opened its third manufacturing plant in the country in Manaus, specifically for lithium iron phosphate batteries, for use in electric buses. BYD has two electric bus assembly facilities in Europe in Komarom, Hungary and Beauvais, France. BYD built a new facility in Chongqing, China for producing its blade batteries, which are considered to be the safest EV batteries. The first plant of the company in India was opened in Chennai.

Recognition

Innovation 
The company has been recognized for innovation; for example it has developed technologies that allow mobile phone batteries to be made at room temperature rather than in expensive, heated dry rooms. In 2010, BusinessWeek ranked BYD the eighth most innovative company in the world  and that same year saw Fast Company ranking BYD as the 16th most innovative. In 2017, PV Magazine awarded BYD the top category of innovation on its newly launched battery storage system that advances progress in three categories: modularity, charging and discharging capacity, and efficiency.

In the media 
In September 2008, MidAmerican Energy Holdings, a subsidiary of Warren Buffett's Berkshire Hathaway Inc, invested about US$230 million for a 10% (or 9.89%) share of BYD at HK$8/share.

Lawsuits and controversies
In December 2018, the Albuquerque council sued BYD over the alleged poor welding, poor battery range, malfunctioning doors and brakes of its buses. BYD denied the allegations, and the lawsuit was settled without money changing hands.

In 2020, the Australian Strategic Policy Institute accused at least 82 major brands, including BYD, of being connected to forced Uyghur labor in Xinjiang.

On April 27, 2020, BYD hired attorney Charles Harder and filed a federal civil complaint in U.S. District Court, Southern District of New York, against Vice Media alleging defamation for a story about BYD using forced Uyghur labor in its supply chain which was published on April 11, 2020. BYD's case was dismissed with prejudice (legal term) in March 2021.

In September 2021, BYD appointed Lu Kewen, an online influencer known for spreading antisemitic tropes, as a spokesperson for the company.

On November 5, 2021, a 36-year-old employee was found dead in a rented home. According to his relatives, his sudden death was due to high-intensity overtime work.

In 2022, the United States Department of Commerce found that BYD had circumvented tariffs on solar panels by routing its operations through Southeast Asian countries.

In February 2023, BYD confirmed the presence of a toxic chemical, hexavalent chromium, in its electric buses in Japan.

Imitation of competing models 
BYD Auto had been accused of taking designs from other manufacturers. Articles claimed BYD F1 "is a clear copy of the Toyota Aygo," that the BYD S6 "closely apes the Lexus RX", the BYD F3 "is a copycat of the Toyota Corolla the BYD S8 has a similar appearance to a Mercedes-Benz SL-Class, and the BYD F8 "features an almost identical Mercedes-Benz CLK front-end and Renault Megane CC rear". Although the U.S. government had been advised by its consul-general in Guangzhou, China that BYD uses an approach of "copying and then modifying car designs." Chinese courts ruled BYD has not infringed on patents.

Nanjing electric vehicle fraud 
In 2016, a peculiar suicide note started an investigation into government subsidy fraud. The auto dealer had been facing bankruptcy and blamed BYD for his situation. According to the note, BYD had received government subsidies for 600 electric buses it had never produced. A single electric bus went for about 2 million yuan (US$305,000). Of 600 buses, the city had received only a few dozen. That year, the Finance Ministry fined five manufacturers (not including BYD) which had fraudulently obtained more than 1 billion yuan (US$153 million) worth of subsidies. The companies were required to return the subsidies in full and also pay penalties worth an additional 50% of subsidies received.

According to the relatives of the man, BYD forced dealerships to increase EV inventories even though sales were bad. In an attempt to clear inventories, dealerships tried selling to people from outside of Nanjing, while simultaneously trying to help them get temporary Nanjing residence documents. But Nanjing would not grant subsidies to outsiders and the dealerships wound up paying the subsidies on 80% of vehicles sold.

Foxconn disputes 
In addition to patent litigation Foxconn sued BYD in Hong Kong and Illinois in 2007, alleging BYD poached 50 Foxconn employees and was complicit in the stealing of trade secrets to set up a competing cell phone manufacturing operation. Court proceedings were brought before BYD Electronic was spun off by BYD later in 2007, delaying the public listing on the Hong Kong stock exchange by half a year.

Foxconn also opened proceedings in the district where BYD is headquartered, at the Shenzhen Intermediate People’s Court, which referred the case to the Supreme People’s Court, which in turn commissioned an appraisal by the Beijing JZSC Intellectual Property Forensic Center into files in BYD's possession which were alleged to belong to Foxconn. Eventually the Shenzhen court made the final judgment: BYD's files contained non-public information originating from Foxconn, which could bring economic benefits to the holders, thereby, BYD was found guilty of infringing Foxconn’s trade secrets.

Afterwards, Foxconn withdrew the civil proceedings against BYD in mainland China, and sought criminal prosecution instead. On March 20, 2008, the former executive director and Vice President of BYD was arrested. Then on March 24 and 31 2008 two former employees of Foxconn were arrested and sentenced to 1 year and 4 months, and 4 years in prison respectively.

BYD issued a counterclaim to Foxconn in Hong Kong court, alleging defamation and bribery of Chinese officials as well as intimidation on Foxconn's part.

See also
Lithium iron phosphate battery

References

External links

 
Companies listed on the Hong Kong Stock Exchange
Companies listed on the Shenzhen Stock Exchange
Companies in the CSI 100 Index
Vehicle manufacturing companies established in 1995
Chinese companies established in 1995
Electronics companies of China
Civilian-run enterprises of China
Berkshire Hathaway
H shares
Electric vehicle battery manufacturers
Battery manufacturers
Conglomerate companies of China
Multinational companies headquartered in China
Chinese brands